Theophile Bigirimana (born 1 January 1993) is a Rwandan long-distance runner.

In 2019, he competed in the senior men's race at the 2019 IAAF World Cross Country Championships held in Aarhus, Denmark. He finished in 47th place.

References

External links 
 

Living people
1993 births
Place of birth missing (living people)
Rwandan male long-distance runners
Rwandan male cross country runners